The Leslie Uggams Show is an American variety television series starring actress/singer Leslie Uggams. The series aired on CBS as part of its 1969 fall lineup, and was the second variety series to feature an African American host, the first since the 1956 - '57 The Nat King Cole Show on NBC.

Synopsis
The Leslie Uggams Show gave Uggams, who had first come to wide public notice as a singer on the early 1960s hit Sing Along With Mitch, her own program to showcase herself and other black performers; unlike other early variety programs which were hosted by black entertainers but featured a large number of whites in the cast, only one of Uggams' regulars, comedian Dennis Allen, was white. A recurring feature of the program was the ongoing series of sketches entitled "Sugar Hill", which dealt with the lives of middle class black family in a large American city.

The series was given the challenging time slot of 9:00 P.M. on Sunday nights which in the early to mid 60's had proven to be unsuccessful for such variety shows as The Judy Garland Show and The Garry Moore Show since the chief competition for both programs was the venerable western series Bonanza. When Moore's show was cancelled in January, 1967, The Smothers Brothers Comedy Hour premiered and immediately became a huge hit for CBS managing to more than hold its own against Bonanza. However, in the spring of 1969, CBS pulled that variety series due to its controversial content and scheduled Uggams's show for the 1969-1970 fall season. Scheduled opposite Bonanza, which was still a massive hit for NBC, and a series of fairly recent (by the standards of the era) movies on ABC, The Leslie Uggams Show had difficulty developing an audience and was cancelled in December 1969. The Glen Campbell Goodtime Hour took over the Sunday night slot on CBS starting on 21 December 1969, with Hee Haw taking over Campbell's vacated Wednesday night slot.

Cast
 Leslie Uggams.....Host
 Dennis Allen.....Regular
 Johnny Brown.....Regular 
 Lillian Hayman.....Regular
 Lincoln Kilpatrick....Regular
 Allison Mills.....Regular
 Roger Carroll.....Announcer
 Nelson Riddle.....Orchestra Leader

Episodes

References

External links
 

1969 American television series debuts
1969 American television series endings
1960s American musical comedy television series
1960s American sketch comedy television series
1960s American variety television series
English-language television shows
CBS original programming